Route 20, or Highway 20, may refer to:

International
 European route E20

Australia
 Sturt Highway (NSW/VIC/SA)
 Yarra Bank Highway

Brazil
 BR-020

Canada 
 Alberta Highway 20
 British Columbia Highway 20
 Manitoba Highway 20
New Brunswick Route 20 (former)
 Newfoundland and Labrador Route 20
 Ontario Highway 20
  Prince Edward Island Route 20
 Quebec Autoroute 20
 Saskatchewan Highway 20

China
  G20 Expressway

Czech Republic
 I/20 Highway; Czech: Silnice I/20

Ecuador
 Ecuador Highway 20

India
  National Highway 20 (India)

Israel 
 Ayalon Highway

Italy
 Autostrada A20

Ireland
  M20 motorway (Ireland)
  N20 road (Ireland)

Japan 
 Japan National Route 20
 Chūō Expressway

Korea, South
 Iksan–Pohang Expressway
 National Route 20
Gukjido 20

New Zealand
 New Zealand State Highway 20 (Auckland Southwestern Motorway)
 New Zealand State Highway 20A
 New Zealand State Highway 20B

Paraguay
 National Route 20

Turkey
  , a motorway in Turkey as the ring road in Ankara.

United Kingdom
 British A20 (London-Dover)
 British M20 (Swanley-Folkestone)
 A20 road (Northern Ireland)

United States 
 Interstate 20
 U.S. Route 20
 U.S. Route 20N (former)
 U.S. Route 20S (former)
 New England Route 20 (former)
 Alabama State Route 20
 Arkansas Highway 20
 California State Route 20
 County Route A20 (California)
 County Route E20 (California)
 County Route G20 (California)
 County Route J20 (California)
County Route S20 (California)
 Connecticut Route 20
 Delaware Route 20
 Florida State Road 20
 Georgia State Route 20
 Georgia State Route 20 (former)
 Georgia State Route 20 (former)
 Illinois Route 20 (former)
 K-20 (Kansas highway)
 Kentucky Route 20
 Louisiana Highway 20
 Louisiana State Route 20
 Maryland Route 20
 Massachusetts Route 20
 M-20 (Michigan highway)
 Minnesota State Highway 20
 County Road 20 (Goodhue County, Minnesota)
 Missouri Route 20
 Nevada State Route 20 (former)
 New Jersey Route 20
 County Route 20 (Monmouth County, New Jersey)
 New Mexico State Road 20
New York State Route 20 (1924–1927) (former)
 New York State Route 20N (former)
 New York State Route 20SY (former)
 County Route 20 (Allegany County, New York)
 County Route 20 (Clinton County, New York)
 County Route 20 (Columbia County, New York)
 County Route 20 (Delaware County, New York)
 County Route 20 (Dutchess County, New York)
 County Route 20 (Genesee County, New York)
 County Route 20 (Livingston County, New York)
 County Route 20 (Niagara County, New York)
 County Route 20 (Ontario County, New York)
 County Route 20 (Orange County, New York)
 County Route 20 (Oswego County, New York)
 County Route 20 (Otsego County, New York)
 County Route 20 (Putnam County, New York)
 County Route 20 (Rensselaer County, New York)
 County Route 20 (Rockland County, New York)
 County Route 20 (Suffolk County, New York)
 County Route 20 (Ulster County, New York)
 County Route 20 (Washington County, New York)
 County Route 20 (Yates County, New York)
 North Carolina Highway 20
 North Dakota Highway 20
 Ohio State Route 20 (1923-1927) (former)
 Oklahoma State Highway 20
 South Carolina Highway 20
 South Dakota Highway 20
 Tennessee State Route 20
 Texas State Highway 20
 Texas State Highway Loop 20
 Farm to Market Road 20
 Texas Park Road 20
 Utah State Route 20
 Virginia State Route 20
 Washington State Route 20
 West Virginia Route 20
 Wisconsin Highway 20

Territories
 Puerto Rico Highway 20
 U.S. Virgin Islands Highway 20

See also 
List of A20 roads
List of highways numbered 20A
List of highways numbered 20B
List of highways numbered 20C
List of highways numbered 20D